Events in the year 1872 in Iceland.

Incumbents 

 Monarch: Christian IX
 Council President of Denmark: Ludvig Holstein-Holsteinborg

Events 

 20 November − Eymundsson, Iceland's oldest bookstore is established.

Births 

 3 March − Sveinn Thorvaldson, Icelandic-Canadian politician
 31 March − Helgi Pjeturss, geologist and philosopher

References 

 
1870s in Iceland
Years of the 19th century in Iceland
Iceland
Iceland